Ivan Vasilyevich Turkenich (15 January 1920 – 14 August 1944) was a Soviet Ukrainian partisan, one of the leaders of the underground anti-Nazi organization Young Guard, which operated in Krasnodon district during World War II between 1941 and 1944.

Biography

Turkenich was born on 15 January 1920, in Novyi Liman, Voronezh Oblast in a family of Ukrainian ethnicity. His father was a miner. After graduation from the 7th grade, he was matriculated to Voroshilov pedagogical institute. In March 1938, he became a member of the Komsomol. In 1938, Turkenich studied in a Sevastopol railroad trade school. In 1940, he began his studies in an anti-aircraft artillery military academy.

In June 1941, Turkenich graduated from the academy and was commissioned as a lieutenant in the Red Army. From May to June 1942, he was a deputy executive officer in the 614th anti-tank artillery regiment. In one of its engagements he was captured by Germans, escaped from imprisonment and joined the anti-Nazi resistance in occupied Krasnodon. He became one of the leaders of the Young Guard, a resistance organization comprising members the Komsomol. In June 1944, Turkenich became a member of the Communist Party of the Soviet Union.

When the Young Guard was compromised and most of its members arrested by Nazis, Turkenich managed to escape. He crossed the front lines and rejoined the uniformed Red Army. He was promoted to command a mortar battery in the 163rd regiment. On 13 August 1944, Turkenich was mortally wounded in a battle near Głogów Małopolski, Poland. He died in the field hospital a day later on 14 August 1944.

For his leadership and bravery, Turkenich was awarded the Order of Red Banner, the Medal "Partisan of the Patriotic War" (1st class), and the Order of the Patriotic War (1st class). In 1990, Turkenich was also awarded the title of Hero of the Soviet Union.

Notes

References 

Alexander Alexandrovich Fadeyev, David Sevirsky and Volet Dutt (2000). The Young Guard, University Press of the Pacific.

External links
(Russian) Иван Васильoвич Туркенич at www.peoples.ru 

1920 births
1944 deaths
People from Voronezh Oblast
People from Bogucharsky Uyezd
Communist Party of the Soviet Union members
Soviet partisans in Ukraine
Soviet prisoners of war
Ukrainian people of World War II
Heroes of the Soviet Union
Recipients of the Order of Lenin
Recipients of the Order of the Red Banner
Soviet military personnel killed in World War II